The following elections occurred in the year 1822.

Europe
 1822 Spanish general election
 1822 Portuguese legislative election

North America

United States
 1822 Illinois gubernatorial election
 1822 New York gubernatorial election
 United States House of Representatives elections in New York, 1822
 1822 United States House of Representatives elections

See also
 :Category:1822 elections

1822
Elections